Bani Amr al-Alli is a sub-district located in Al Qafr District, Ibb Governorate, Yemen. Bani Amr al-Alli had a population of  3724 as of 2004.

References 

Sub-districts in Al Qafr District